Catch .44 is a 2011 American crime thriller film written and directed by Aaron Harvey and starring Forest Whitaker, Bruce Willis, Malin Åkerman, Nikki Reed, Deborah Ann Woll, and Brad Dourif.

Plot 
Drug boss Mel sends his associates Tes, Dawn, and Kara to intercept a truck driver bringing rival drugs to a diner at night. The women wait for the driver at the diner, but when they fail to identify him, they draw guns on the diner's other occupants and demand if anyone knows who the driver is. Instead, a shootout ensues when Francine, the diner's owner, and Jesse, a patron, draw firearms of their own. Kara, Francine, Dawn, and Jesse are killed and Tes finds herself in a standoff with Billy, the diner's cook. As Tes and Billy point their weapons at each other, their situation becomes more complicated when Ronny, another associate of Mel's, arrives at the diner.

It is eventually revealed that no drugs were coming to the diner and the job was a set-up. Mel hired Billy, Jesse, and Francine, who all work for him, to kill Tes and her cohorts. Ronny, who is infatuated with Tes, says he came to the diner to rescue her and steal the money Mel supposedly gave Billy for this assignment, although Billy denies having it. Ronny orders Tes to shoot Billy, but she turns her gun on Ronny, and a second shootout occurs.

Mel comes to the diner and discovers Ronny is apparently the only survivor of the gunfight. After a brief conversation, Mel shoots Ronny in the face. Tes, however, turns out to still be alive and guns Mel down. She then intercepts a car carrying Mel's money and drives off with the cash.

Cast 
 Malin Åkerman as Tes
 Bruce Willis as Mel
 Forest Whitaker as Ronny
 Nikki Reed as Kara
 Deborah Ann Woll as Dawn
 Shea Whigham as Billy
 Brad Dourif as Sheriff Connors
 Jimmy Lee Jr. as Jesse
 Jill Stokesberry as Francine
 PJ Marshall as Deputy 
 Dan Silver as Businessman David
 Michael Rosenbaum as Brandon
 Edrick Browne as Davon

Production

Shooting started on July 8, 2010 in Louisiana, and lasted 20 days.

Early on, there were several changes to the cast, particularly within the female lead roles. Maggie Grace was originally attached to play Tes, and Lauren German was attached to play Kara, however both women had to drop out due to scheduling conflicts. Laura Ramsey was also considered for the role of Dawn.

After Malin Åkerman signed on to play Tes, Bruce Willis and Forest Whitaker were attached to the film. Lizzy Caplan and Kate Mara were then brought on as Dawn and Kara, respectively. However, a few days later, Caplan dropped out and was replaced with Deborah Ann Woll for the role of Dawn. Mara dropped out the movie as well, due to scheduling conflicts, and was replaced by Nikki Reed, thus completing the cast.

The film features art by Dallas-based artist Elisa Guardiola.

Distribution
The rights to Catch .44 were picked up by Anchor Bay Films. Independent film producer Cassian Elwes brokered the deal.

Box office
As of November 11, 2022, Catch .44 grossed $291,742 in the United Arab Emirates, South Africa, the Netherlands, Belgium, and Portugal, on a budget of $10.4 million.

Reception
Neil Genzlinger of The New York Times gave the film 2 out of 5, and wrote: "A drug-deal tale featuring top-drawer actors trying to have fun with a medium-strength script. Sometimes they succeed, but not often enough to elevate the film to Pulp Fiction territory." Writing for The Hollywood Reporter, Duane Byrge said: "There's some fun, cheeky inside stuff – Bruce Willis wailing 'Respect' – which might make for hilarity in talent agency screening rooms, but that's about the most favorable demographic this low-caliber oddity will attract."

References

External links
 
 

American independent films
Films shot in Louisiana
2011 films
2011 independent films
MoviePass Films films
Films produced by Megan Ellison
2010s English-language films
Films directed by Aaron Harvey
2010s American films
2010 directorial debut films